The Istituto italiano per l'Intelligenza artificiale (I3A) is a planned scientific research centre to be based in Turin Italy, European Union.

The centre was first proposed in the Italian National Strategy for Artificial Intelligence, published by the Ministry of Economic Development (Italy).

See also 
 Turin
 University of Turin
 Polytechnic of Turin

References

External links 

 Artificial Intelligence research at Dipartimento di Informatica University of Turin

 

Artificial intelligence laboratories
Computer science institutes in Italy
Laboratories in Italy
Information technology research institutes